Klenovaya is a rural locality (a village) in Krasnopolyanskoye Rural Settlement, Nikolsky District, Vologda Oblast, Russia. The population was 12 as of 2002.

Geography 
Klenovaya is located 41 km northwest of Nikolsk (the district's administrative centre) by road. Pertyug is the nearest rural locality.

References 

Rural localities in Nikolsky District, Vologda Oblast